Tenapanor, used in form of tenapanor hydrochloride and sold under the brand name Ibsrela, is a treatment for adults with a disease of the gut called irritable bowel syndrome with constipation commonly referred to as IBS-C.

Tenapanor is a drug developed by Ardelyx, which acts as an inhibitor of the sodium-proton exchanger NHE3. This antiporter protein is found in the kidney and intestines, and normally acts to regulate the levels of sodium absorbed and secreted by the body. When administered orally, tenapanor selectively inhibits sodium uptake in the intestines, limiting the amount absorbed from food, and thereby reduces levels of sodium in the body. This may make it useful in the treatment of chronic kidney disease and hypertension, both of which are exacerbated by excess sodium in the diet.

It was approved for medical use in the United States in 2019. The U.S. Food and Drug Administration (FDA) considers it to be a first-in-class medication.

References

External links 
 

Drugs acting on the gastrointestinal system and metabolism